Arthur Hugh Lister   (1830–1908) was a wine merchant and botanist, known for his research on Mycetozoa also known as slime molds.

Life
Lister was born in Upton House, Upton, Essex. He was the youngest son of Joseph Jackson Lister, a brother of the celebrated Joseph Lister, and father of the mycologist and botanical illustrator Gulielma Lister. He was educated at Hitchin and left school at sixteen to go into business. He became a partner in a company of wine merchants and retired from business in 1888.

He was elected a fellow of the Linnean Society in 1873 and was the Society's vice-president in 1895–1896. He was president of the Mycological Society in 1906–1907. He married in 1855 and was the father of four daughters and three sons, one of whom was the zoologist Joseph Jackson Lister. Much of Arthur Lister's scientific work was done in collaboration with his daughter Gulielma. On 9 June 1898, Lister was elected to the fellowship of the Royal Society.

He was honoured in 1901, when botanists Penzig & P.A.Saccardo published Listeromyces, Then in 1906, Eduard Adolf
Wilhelm Jahn published Listerella paradoxa which is a slime mould species from the class Myxogastria and the only member of its genus, as well as the family Listerelliidae.

References

External links
 
 

1830 births
1908 deaths
19th-century British botanists
Fellows of the Linnean Society of London
Fellows of the Royal Society